The Sioux–Hustler Trail is a  hiking trail in the Boundary Waters Canoe Area in northeastern Minnesota. The trail is approximately an hour's drive from Ely, Minnesota, along the Echo Trail.

Trail Information

References

External links
 Boundary Water Canoe Area Wilderness' Website
 Superior National Forest Site
 Trail Map

Hiking trails in Minnesota
Protected areas of St. Louis County, Minnesota